Pseudopedinaspis is a genus of flightless African spider wasps from the subfamily Ctenocerinae. The genus name is feminine, following ICZN Article 30.1.2.

Species
Pseudopedinaspis fasciata Arnold, 1940
Pseudopedinaspis marshalli Brauns, 1906
Pseudopedinaspis sanguinolenta (Heymons, 1915)

References

Hymenoptera genera
Pompilidae